This is a list of Armenian provinces (marzer) by Human Development Index as of 2021, including Yerevan, the capital and largest city.

References 

Armenia
Human Development Index
Provinces By Human Development Index
HDI